The 1955–56 Danish Cup was the 2nd installment of the Danish Cup, the highest football competition in Denmark.

Final

References

1955-56
1955–56 domestic association football cups
1955–56 in Danish football